Miller Lake may refer to:

 In Canada
Miller Lake (Nova Scotia), a lake in Fall River, Nova Scotia
Miller Lake, a lake in Guysborough County, Nova Scotia
Miller Lake, a lake in Hants County, Nova Scotia
Miller Lake Mooseland, a lake in Halifax Regional Municipality, Nova Scotia
Miller Lake, a lake of the Gouin Reservoir, in La Tuque, in Mauricie, in Quebec.

 In the United States
 Miller Lake, a lake in Arkansas County, Arkansas
 Miller Lake, a lake in Columbia County, Arkansas
 Miller Lake, a lake in Prairie County, Arkansas
 Miller Lake (Carver County, Minnesota)
 Miller Lake, a lake in Yellow Medicine County, Minnesota
 Miller Lake in Deer Lodge County, Montana
Miller Lake (Flathead County, Montana) in Flathead County, Montana
Miller Lake (Powell County, Montana) in Powell County, Montana
 Miller Lake in Musselshell County, Montana
 Miller Lake (Oregon), a lake in Klamath County, Oregon